Phoque Island is a rocky island  long, the southernmost island in a small group  north of Cape Margerie, Antarctica. Charted in 1951 by the French Antarctic Expedition, it was named by them for the numerous seals near the island, "phoque" being the French for seal. The island is located on the South-East of the coast of Antarctica, in the southern hemisphere.

See also 
 List of Antarctic and sub-Antarctic islands

Islands of Adélie Land